Gehlhaar may refer to:

Rolf Gehlhaar (1943–2019), composer and professor of experimental music
Gehlhaar, a manufacturer of Königsberg marzipan